Jake Hooker may refer to:

Jake Hooker (musician) (1952–2014), Israeli-born musician
Jake Hooker (journalist) (born 1973), American journalist